Liouying District is a rural district of about 20,503 residents in Tainan, Taiwan.

History
After the handover of Taiwan from Japan to the Republic of China in 1945, Liouying was organized as a rural township of Tainan County. On 25 December 2010, Tainan County was merged with Tainan City and Liouying was upgraded to a district of the city.

Administrative divisions 
Shilin, Guangfu, Zhongcheng, Tungsheng, Baweng, Renhe, Taikang, Zhongxi, Dunong, Danong, Shennong, Guoyi and Xushan Village.

Education 
 Min-Hwei College of Health Care Management

Tourist attractions 
 Deyuanpi Holland Village
 Jianshanpi Jiangnan Resort
 Liu Chi-hsiang Art Gallery and Memorial Hall
 Liu Clan Shrine
 Foshan Guanyin Temple
 Jianshanpi Reservoir
 Liouying Daitian Temple
 Nanyuan Recreational Farm
 Taikang Green Tunnel

Transportation 

 TRA Liuying Station

Notable natives
 Liu Chi-hsiang

References

External links 

  

Districts of Tainan